Norwegian Epic is a cruise ship of the Norwegian Cruise Line built under that line's F3 Project by STX Europe Chantiers de l'Atlantique shipyard in Saint-Nazaire, France. When built she was the third largest cruise ship in the world.

Two ships in this Epic class were ordered by NCL in November 2006, with an option for a third vessel that was not exercised. A dispute between NCL and STX initially resulted in the construction of both ships being placed on hold until a new agreement was reached.  The agreement called for completion of the first ship; the second ship was cancelled in 2008. The sole remaining ship, Norwegian Epic, was delivered to NCL on 17 June 2010.

After completion and acceptance, Norwegian Epic sailed on Thursday 24 June 2010 from Southampton to New York.

Overview
Norwegian Epic surpasses the Breakaway-class as NCL's second largest ship class. She represents the "third generation" of Freestyle cruising vessels and its size allows NCL to have ships in the "mega-class" of their competitors at Royal Caribbean International and Carnival Cruise Lines, though still 32% smaller by gross tonnage than Royal Caribbean's Oasis of the Seas, Allure of the Seas and Harmony of the Seas, the world's largest passenger vessels.

Norwegian Epic has 4,100 passenger berths and the only tube and bowl water slide at sea. The ship also has a rappelling wall and a three-lane bowling alley together with a 17 °F (−8 °C) Ice Bar where customers have to wear parkas.

On 13 April 2010, NCL CEO Kevin Sheehan along with Macy's, Inc CEO Terry J. Lundgren and NBC CEO Jeff Zucker announced that the Macy's 34th Annual 4 July Fireworks would take place on Norwegian Epic (The fireworks were off on another Ship) The NBC One-Hour Telecast of the Event was broadcast from the Norwegian Epic.

On July 2, 2010, the ship was christened at a ceremony in New York by its godmother, American country music artist Reba McEntire.

Concept and construction
Norwegian Epic is powered by a diesel-electric plant, with the six long-stroke MaK engines providing a total of 79.8 MW for ship propulsion and on-board electricity supply. Electrical power then drives high-torque density induction motors which turn two conventional (non-azimuthing) propellers.

The F3-class ship was built by STX Europe at the Chantiers de l'Atlantique shipyard in Saint-Nazaire, France. The last ship delivered to NCL that was not at least partially built at a German shipyard was the Windward of 1993. Since that date and until this order, NCL's new buildings have been built at the German Meyer Werft, Lloyd Werft, Bremer Vulkan and Aker MTW shipyards.

In September 2008, a dispute over the price of the first F3 vessel (at the time approximately 25% complete) arose between Norwegian Cruise Line and STX France. Reportedly the sale of 50% of NCL to Apollo Management in August 2007 resulted in Apollo making several changes to the designs, resulting in a higher cost for the first vessel. One of the changes included the addition of three decks atop her superstructure as a homage to the Norway, which was sold for scrap the year before, despite the decks being criticised for making the vessel appear top-heavy. A dispute between NCL and STX initially resulted in the construction of both ships being placed on hold until a new agreement was reached. It was reported that the construction of the second ship was unaffected by the dispute, but ultimately it was announced that the first ship will be completed and the construction of the second ship will be canceled. Despite this agreement, relations between NCL and STX France remained strained which resulted in the Norwegian Epic being the latest NCL vessel built in France as all future NCL ships have been built in the German Meyer Werft.

The sea trials of Norwegian Epic occurred over four days beginning on 10 February 2010. During these trials 300 technicians and engineers from STX France, along with 30 Norwegian Cruise Line representatives, checked more than 60 aspects of the ship's performance by running trials of the ship's speed, maneuverability, hydrodynamics and propulsion in the Atlantic Ocean.

In early May 2010, a fire broke out in a provisioning area aft on Deck 4; firefighters were able to contain the fire before it spread, with the only damage to an area of cabling. The conditions were found to be suspicious (there was no welding or other 'hot' work in the area, and the extinguishing system was non-operational), and the event was investigated by Saint-Nazaire police as an arson attack. It was suspected some workers may have deliberately set the fire as revenge for the price dispute between NCL and STX France. Despite the damage, Norwegian Epic was delivered on time.

A second round of sea trials was conducted on 11 June 2010, which finalized all the aspects of the ship. Afterwards, the ship, named the Norwegian Epic, was delivered to NCL on 17 June 2010.

Areas of operation
Norwegian Epic was originally based out of Miami, sailing Western Caribbean cruises. In 2013 and 2014, Norwegian Epic undertook winter cruises between October and April sailing from Miami, FL to the Caribbean and after a repositioning transatlantic sailing, undertook cruises from southern European ports around the Mediterranean between April and October.

In April 2015, Norwegian Epic repositioned and had a home port year round in Barcelona.

In November 2016 Norwegian Epic returned to the Caribbean, this time based out of Port Canaveral (Orlando). Then Barcelona for April to November 2017, and back to Port Canaveral for winter 2017/18. 

Beginning in January 2017, she began hosting the annual dance music festival Holy Ship!.

In March of 2022, NCL announced that in 2023, the Epic will be redeployed from its current summer itinerary and that all cruises from May through October are cancelled.

Incidents 

On 7 August 2018, Norwegian Epic experienced a minor engine fault at 11pm. Situation was under control however witnesses said that lifeboats were in the process of being launched. Problem was fixed in an hour.

On February 12, 2019, after suffering a critical engine failure, Norwegian Epic collided into a dock at San Juan, Puerto Rico, slightly damaging the ship but causing significant damage to the pier. The Epic was diverting to San Juan following power outages and mechanical problems, the ship had to cancel all scheduled ports of call due to the repairs. The NTSB investigation into the accident found that there was a lack of communication/coordination between the ship master and the pilot.

On June 8, 2019, a 63-year-old South Korean woman fell overboard from Norwegian Epic while she was travelling from Cannes, France, to Palma de Mallorca, Spain. After several hours of searching, involving the relevant authorities and Norwegian Epic herself, the search was called off, although the woman is still missing.

Media 

Norwegian Epic was the subject of Mighty Ships series 5, episode 1, first broadcast July 2011.

References

Notes

Bibliography

External links

 NCL Norwegian Epic
 Norwegian Epic - Current Position
 Norwegian Epic - Status at marinetraffic.com

Ships built in France
Ships of Norwegian Cruise Line
2009 ships